Anton Koch may refer to:

 Joseph Anton Koch (1768–1839), Austrian painter
 Anton Koch (footballer) (1903–1963), Austrian footballer